Stockholm East is a Swedish drama film, released in 2011 and directed by Simon Kaijser.

Plot 
Stockholm East is the love story between two strangers, bound together by a tragedy that has taken its toll on both their lives and relationships. They meet and begin a passionate relationship, while both of them hide an inconvenient truth from the other. The story starts with Johan (Persbrandt) accidentally hitting nine-year-old Tove, daughter of Anna (Iben Hjejle), with his car, and killing her. Both adult characters have a hard time moving on with their life, and their relationships with their SOs suffer. About a year later, the two of them meet by chance. Johan knows who Anna is, but Anna doesn't know who Johan is - she is simply grateful to have someone in her life who she can talk to about Tove, pretending that her daughter is still alive. Slowly, they fall in love.

Cast 
 Mikael Persbrandt - Johan
 Iben Hjejle - Anna
 Liv Mjönes - Kattis
 Henrik Norlén - Anders
 Astrid Assefa - Nurse
 Lars-Erik Berenett - Kattis Dad
 Moa Zetterlund - Minna
 Jimmy Lindström - Minnas Dad
 Rebecca Englund - new mom
 Ulf Friberg - new father
 Anna Godenius - Prosecutor
 Annika Hallin - Remembering Mom
 Peter Parkrud - Therapist
 Fredrik Nilsson - The guy in the tunnel

External links
 

Swedish drama films
2011 films
2011 drama films
2010s Swedish films